The 1998 FIVB Men's World Championship was the fourteenth edition of the tournament, organised by the world's governing body, the FIVB. It was held from 13 to 29 November 1998 in Fukuoka, Kobe, Sendai, Sapporo, Kawasaki, Uozu, Hiroshima, Osaka, Chiba, Hamamatsu, and Tokyo, Japan.

Teams

Qualification

Squads

Venues
 Marine Messe Fukuoka, Fukuoka – Pool A
 Kobe Green Arena, Kobe – Pool B
 Sendai City Gymnasium, Sendai – Pool C
 Makomanai Indoor Stadium, Sapporo – Pool D
 Todoroki Arena, Kawasaki – Pool E
 Uozu Techno Sports Dome, Uozu – Pool F
 Hiroshima Green Arena, Hiroshima – Pool G
 Namihaya Dome, Osaka – Pool G
 Makuhari Messe, Chiba – Pool H
 Hamamatsu Arena, Hamamatsu – Pool H
 Yoyogi National Gymnasium, Tokyo – Final round

Results

First round

Pool A

|}

|}

Pool B

|}

|}

Pool C

|}

|}

Pool D

|}

|}

Pool E

|}

|}

Pool F

|}

|}

Second round

Pool G

|}

|}

Pool H

|}

|}

Final round

9th–12th places

9th–12th semifinals

|}

11th place match

|}

9th place match

|}

5th–8th places

5th–8th semifinals

|}

7th place match

|}

5th place match

|}

Finals

semifinals

|}

3rd place match

|}

final

|}

Final standing

Awards

 Most Valuable Player
  Rafael Pascual
 Best Scorer
  Rafael Pascual
 Best Spiker
  Marcos Milinkovic
 Best Blocker
  Gustavo Endres
 Best Server
  Goran Vujević

 Best Setter
  Raúl Diago
 Best Digger
  Erik Sullivan
 Best Receiver
  Rodolfo Sánchez
 Best Coach
  Bebeto de Freias (Italy)
 Most Creative Coach
  Vincenzo Di Pinto (Spain)

External links
 Federation Internationale de Volleyball
 Official website (Archived 2009-05-11)

W
Volleyball
V
FIVB Volleyball Men's World Championship